Dubois is a town in Fremont County, Wyoming, United States. The population was 971 at the 2010 census, but dropped to 911 in the 2020 census. The population nearly doubles in the summer with many part-time residents.  

While the Town of Dubois includes 3.49 mi² within the Town Limits which constitutes a population density of 261 people per square mile, the 82513 ZIP Code ("Dubois, Wyoming") includes 1,537.47 mi² and has a total population of 1,549 which is a population density of about 1 person per square mile. For comparison, the Dubois, Wyoming ZIP Code is 324 square miles larger than the entire state of Rhode Island.

History
The original residents of Dubois, Wyoming wanted to name the town Tibo, after the Shoshone-language word for "stranger" or "white man," which was the Natives' affectionate name for their Episcopal priest, Father John Roberts. However, the postal service found this name unacceptable, so Governor Joseph M. Carey named the town with the name Dubois after his friend Fred Dubois, an Idaho senator at the time. In protest, the citizens of Dubois rejected the French pronunciation of "deh-bwah", instead opting for Du, with u as in "Sue"; bois, with oi as in "voice". This local legend is most likely not true as the town in Idaho, named after the same Idaho Senator, is pronounced the same way as the town in Wyoming. The accent is on the first syllable.

The first occupants of the mountains and valleys surrounding what is now Dubois were members of the Sheepeaters, a group of Mountain Shoshone, who included the Wind River area in their regular annual migrations from the Great Plains through the mountains of Yellowstone and beyond.  The Wind River Valley surrounding Dubois contains numerous remnants of these people who lived in the area for many hundreds of years before they were relocated into a nearby reservation. Relics of their existence in the mountains and valleys around Dubois include numerous prehistoric petroglyphs, hunting traps and blinds, and stone tepee circles.

The first Europeans to enter the area were trappers Francois and Louis Verendrye in 1742–43. In the years to follow, the Wind River valley was visited regularly by the Astorians and other fur trappers and hunters through the early 19th century. The first homesteaders arrived in the late 1870s.

Butch Cassidy (Robert LeRoy Parker) owned and managed a ranch on the outskirts of Dubois, beginning in 1890.  It is said that he was a frequent customer at Welty's General Store in Dubois, which is still in operation. A statue recently erected in the center of Dubois is modeled after Butch Cassidy.
In 1913, the town expanded with the addition of a hotel, a bar, and a general store, anticipating the arrival of Scandinavian lumber workers brought there by the Wyoming Tie and Timber Company the following year. (All of these structures are still standing.)

St. Thomas Episcopal Church was founded in 1910 by Reverend John Roberts, an Episcopal missionary who served the Native American tribes on the Wind River.

Charles Moore built the first of many dude ranches in the area, Ramshorn Ranch and Camp Yellowstone, at the mouth of the DuNoir Creek west of Dubois in 1907.

In the landscape surrounding Dubois are visible the remains of many wood flumes constructed by the tie hacks who provided the railroad ties that helped to develop the American West. These Scandinavian immigrants cut logs into ties and sent these via the flumes to the Wind River where they floated to Riverton, about 70 miles east, for processing.

The Dubois Museum preserves and interprets the natural and social history of the Upper Wind River Valley as the National Bighorn Sheep Interpretive Center focuses on public education about the biology and habitat of the Rocky Mountain Bighorn Sheep with specific focus on the currently largest herd of Rocky Mountain Bighorn sheep in the coterminous United States that winter in the Whiskey Basin of Whiskey Mountain adjacent to the Fitzpatrick Wilderness in the Shoshone National Forest. The Center preserves and interprets the relationships of the Bighorn sheep.

The town is on U.S. Route 26 and is the beginning of the Wyoming Centennial Scenic Byway, U.S. Route 26 crossing the Continental Divide at Togwotee Pass.

A significant proportion of Dubois residents are writers, artists, photographers, musicians and songwriters, drawn to the remote town in part by its relatively moderate climate and remarkable scenery. Annual cultural events include a national art show and a quilt show, a horseback chariot race, and extensive celebrations during July 4 weekend. During summer months, a square dance and a rodeo including local and regional competitors take place every week.

On December 30, 2014, several businesses burned to the ground in the downtown area. The air temperatures at the time of the blaze were hovering near -35 °F with wind chills in the range of 50 below zero (-50 °F). Firefighters battled freezing equipment and gear throughout the night to get the fire under control. The blaze was ruled accidental. The origin of the fire appeared to be inside the rear of the "Main Street Mart" building in the attic above a wood stove. The fire was most likely caused by charring (pyrolysis) that resulted from the chimney coming into contact with building materials. Approximately half a block of Downtown Dubois was destroyed by the fire. In July 2016, a wildfire on the outskirts of Dubois again prompted evacuations.

In August 2020, the National Museum of Military Vehicles  opened southeast of Dubois. The privately funded $100M museum was founded by Dan Starks, a former lawyer and CEO of St. Jude Medical. It contains 500 fully restored military vehicles, artillery pieces, naval vessels and aircraft dating from 1897 to the present, depicting the American experience in World War II, the Korean War, and the Vietnam War with a focus on the people who used the equipment as much as on the equipment itself.

Geography
Dubois is located at  (43.535936, -109.635915) and an elevation of 2115 m (6940 ft). The Wind River runs through the town.

Climate

According to the Köppen Climate Classification system, Dubois has a warm-summer humid continental climate, abbreviated "Dfb" on climate maps.

Demographics

2010 census

As of the census of 2010, there were 971 people, 507 households, and 256 families residing in the town. The racial makeup of the town was 95.8% White, 0.4% African American, 0.9% Native American, 1.2% Asian, 0.2% from other races, and 1.4% from two or more races. Hispanic or Latino of any race were 0.4% of the population.

There were 507 households, of which 14.4% had children under the age of 18 living with them, 41.4% were married couples living together, 5.9% had a female householder with no husband present, 3.2% had a male householder with no wife present, and 49.5% were non-families. 40.6% of all households were made up of individuals, and 17.2% had someone living alone who was 65 years of age or older. The average household size was 1.92 and the average family size was 2.55.

The median age in the town was 51.6 years. 13.8% of residents were under the age of 18; 5.4% were between the ages of 18 and 24; 18.9% were from 25 to 44; 36.7% were from 45 to 64; and 25.1% were 65 years of age or older. The gender makeup of the town was 49.9% male and 50.1% female.

2000 census
As of the census of 2000, there were 962 people, 451 households, and 274 families residing in the town. The population density was 370.3 people per square mile (142.9/km2). There were 556 housing units at an average density of 214.0 per square mile (82.6/km2). The racial makeup of the town was 96.15% White, 0.10% African American, 1.25% Native American, 0.31% Asian, 0.31% from other races, and 1.87% from two or more races. Hispanic or Latino of any race were 1.14% of the population.

There were 451 households, out of which 22.6% had children under the age of 18 living with them, 49.4% were married couples living together, 8.4% had a female householder with no husband present, and 39.2% were non-families. 32.6% of all households were made up of individuals, and 8.9% had someone living alone who was 65 years of age or older. The average household size was 2.13 and the average family size was 2.68.

In the town, the population was spread out, with 20.9% under the age of 18, 5.1% from 18 to 24, 25.9% from 25 to 44, 29.6% from 45 to 64, and 18.5% who were 65 years of age or older. The median age was 44 years. For every 100 females, there were 99.2 males. For every 100 females age 18 and over, there were 100.8 males.

The median income for a household in the town was $28,194, and the median income for a family was $33,409. Males had a median income of $28,125 versus $16,719 for females. The per capita income for the town was $15,657. About 9.9% of families and 12.0% of the population were below the poverty line, including 13.8% of those under age 18 and 3.7% of those age 65 or over.

Education
Public education in the town of Dubois is provided by Fremont County School District #2. The district has one campus which serves Kindergarten - Grade 12.  In 2014, Dubois Public Schools built onto the existing Elementary/Middle School to create a K-12 school. As of the 2014-2015 school year, the district enrollment for Dubois Schools was 146.

Dubois has a public library, a branch of the Fremont County Library System.

Highways
  - U.S. Route 26 and U.S. 287 run concurrently through Dubois, on West Ramshorn.

Cultural references
The geology of the area surrounding Dubois is unique in the world for featuring (almost in the same view) examples of all three major mountain-building forces: tectonic, volcanic, and glacial. This is described in detail in the nonfiction book Rising from the Plains by science writer John McPhee.

The body of Marine PFC Chance Phelps was taken to his parents' home in Dubois after his death in Iraq in 2004.  The story is featured in the HBO film Taking Chance.

Much of the videogame,'Firewatch,' takes places in the region surrounding Dubois. It is mentioned on signposts within the game.

Notable people

 Butch Cassidy (1866–1908), the train and bank robber, who at one point owned a ranch on the outskirts of Dubois
 Gardello Dano Christensen (1907–1991), writer of westerns and children's books
 Trudy Dittmar (born 1944), nature writer, essayist
 Kate M. Fox (born 1955), chief justice of the Wyoming Supreme Court
 Matthew Fox (born 1966), actor most known for his work in the ABC drama series Lost
 Woodie Held (1932–2009), baseball player; originally from Sacramento, California, he lived until his death in Dubois
 Michael Hossack (1946–2012), drummer for The Doobie Brothers, Originally from Paterson, New Jersey, lived until his death in Dubois
 Connie Kemmerer, businesswoman, philanthropist; co-owns a dude ranch near Dubois
 Jay Kemmerer (born 1947), businessman, philanthropist who with his siblings co-owns a dude ranch near Dubois
 Gale W. McGee (1915–1992), former United States Senator (He was a teacher at University of Wyoming in Laramie, Wyoming)
 Chance Phelps (1984–2004), US Marine killed in Iraq, subject of the film Taking Chance
 Gerry Spence (born 1929), trial lawyer; native of Laramie, Wyoming, established the Trial Lawyers College at Thunderhead Ranch, which is ten miles outside of Dubois

References

External links
 Dubois chamber of Commerce
 Official town website

 
Towns in Fremont County, Wyoming
Towns in Wyoming